Spectacle Lake may refer to:

Bodies of water
Spectacle Lake (New York), in Fulton and Hamilton Counties
Spectacle Lake (Herkimer County, New York)
Spectacle Lake (Minnesota)
Spectacle Lake (Nova Scotia)
Spectacle Lake (Washington)

Communities
Spectacle Lake, South Australia, a locality
Spectacle Lake Provincial Park, British Columbia